The 1972–73 Allsvenskan was the 39th season of the top division of Swedish handball. 10 teams competed in the league. IF Saab won the regular season and also won the playoffs to claim their second Swedish title. IF Guif and IFK Lidingö were relegated.

League table

Playoffs

Semifinals
 IF Saab–IFK Malmö 26–18, 19–29, 19–6 (IF Saab advance to the finals)
 SoIK Hellas–HK Drott 17–14, 19–17 (SoIK Hellas advance to the finals)

Finals
 IF Saab–SoIK Hellas 14–14, 22–12 (IF Saab champions)

References 

Swedish handball competitions